Old Glory is a common nickname for the flag of the United States, bestowed by William Driver.

Old Glory may also refer to:
 "Old Glory" (King of the Hill), an episode of the TV show, King of the Hill
 Old Glory (film), a 1939 Merrie Melodies short
 Old Glory, Arizona, an unincorporated community
 Old Glory, Tennessee, an unincorporated community
 Old Glory, Texas, an unincorporated community in Stonewall County, Texas, USA
 Old Glory (aircraft), a Fokker lost in 1927 during an attempt to fly from the United States to Italy
 Old Glory: An American Voyage, 1981 travel book by Jonathan Raban
 The Old Glory, a play written by the poet Robert Lowell
 Koumansetta rainfordi, or Old glory,  a Goby from the Western Pacific
 Old Glory, a 1916 book by Mary Raymond Shipman Andrews
 Old Glory DC, a professional rugby union team playing in Washington, DC